Erlend Hustad (born 3 January 1997) is a Norwegian football player who plays as a striker for Jerv in the Eliteserien.

Career statistics

Club

Notes

References

External links

1997 births
Living people
People from Molde
Norwegian footballers
Norway youth international footballers
Molde FK players
Notodden FK players
SK Brann players
Nest-Sotra Fotball players
Sandnes Ulf players
FK Jerv players
Norwegian Second Division players
Norwegian First Division players
Eliteserien players
Association football forwards
Sportspeople from Møre og Romsdal